David Johnston (born 10 July 1955) is an Australian former cricketer. He played fourteen first-class and one List A matches for New South Wales between 1977/78 and 1981/82.

See also
 List of New South Wales representative cricketers

References

External links
 

1955 births
Living people
Australian cricketers
New South Wales cricketers
People from Maitland, New South Wales
Cricketers from New South Wales